Ivanhoe is a small, unincorporated community in Lake County, Illinois, United States near Mundelein. It took its name from the 1820 novel Ivanhoe by Sir Walter Scott. It is home to a private golf course named the Ivanhoe Golf Club that hosted three PGA Web.com Tour events in 2017 through 2019. The course itself is also split into two private, gated communities, the Woods of Ivanhoe in addition to the Ivanhoe Estates.

References

Unincorporated communities in Illinois
Unincorporated communities in Lake County, Illinois